Iglesia de Santa María de la Oliva is a 13th-century stone church in Villaviciosa of the autonomous community of the Principality of Asturias, in Spain.  The church and town is on the coast of Biscay Bay in northern Spain.

The stone Gothic church was completed in the Spanish Gothic style in the 1270s.

See also
Monasterio de Santa María de Valdediós
Spanish Gothic architecture

Notes

Churches completed in 1270
13th-century Roman Catholic church buildings in Spain
Churches in Asturias
Gothic architecture in Asturias
Stone churches in Spain
Bien de Interés Cultural landmarks in Asturias